The meridian 107° east of Greenwich is a line of longitude that extends from the North Pole across the Arctic Ocean, Asia, the Indian Ocean, the Southern Ocean, and Antarctica to the South Pole.

The 107th meridian east forms a great circle with the 73rd meridian west.

From Pole to Pole
Starting at the North Pole and heading south to the South Pole, the 107th meridian east passes through:

{| class="wikitable"
! Width="130" | Co-ordinates
! Country, territory or sea
! Notes
|-
| style="background:#b0e0e6;" | 
| style="background:#b0e0e6;" | Arctic Ocean
| style="background:#b0e0e6;" |
|-
| style="background:#b0e0e6;" | 
| style="background:#b0e0e6;" | Laptev Sea
| style="background:#b0e0e6;" |
|-
| 
| 
|  Krasnoyarsk Krai — Maly Taymyr Island, Severnaya Zemlya
|-valign="top"
| style="background:#b0e0e6;" | 
| style="background:#b0e0e6;" | Laptev Sea
| style="background:#b0e0e6;" | Passing between the Komsomolskaya Pravda Islands,  Krasnoyarsk Krai,  (at )
|-
| 
| 
| Krasnoyarsk Krai — Taymyr Peninsula
|-
| style="background:#b0e0e6;" | 
| style="background:#b0e0e6;" | Faddey Bay
| style="background:#b0e0e6;" |
|-
| 
| 
| Krasnoyarsk Krai — Taymyr Peninsula
|-
| style="background:#b0e0e6;" | 
| style="background:#b0e0e6;" | Khatanga Gulf
| style="background:#b0e0e6;" |
|-valign="top"
| 
| 
|-
| 
| 
| Passing just east of Ulan Bator (at )
|-valign="top"
| 
| 
| Inner Mongolia Ningxia – from  Gansu – from  Shaanxi – from  Sichuan – from  Chongqing – from  Guizhou – from  Guangxi – from 
|-
| 
| 
| Mainland and Cat Ba Island
|-
| style="background:#b0e0e6;" | 
| style="background:#b0e0e6;" | South China Sea
| style="background:#b0e0e6;" | Gulf of Tonkin
|-
| 
| 
|
|-
| 
| 
|
|-
| 
| 
|
|-
| 
| 
|
|-valign="top"
| style="background:#b0e0e6;" | 
| style="background:#b0e0e6;" | South China Sea
| style="background:#b0e0e6;" | Passing through the Badas Islands,  (at ) Passing just west of the island of Liat,  (at ) Passing just east of the island of Lepar,  (at )
|-
| style="background:#b0e0e6;" | 
| style="background:#b0e0e6;" | Java Sea
| style="background:#b0e0e6;" |
|-
| 
| 
| Island of Java - passing just east of Jakarta (at )
|-
| style="background:#b0e0e6;" | 
| style="background:#b0e0e6;" | Indian Ocean
| style="background:#b0e0e6;" |
|-
| style="background:#b0e0e6;" | 
| style="background:#b0e0e6;" | Southern Ocean
| style="background:#b0e0e6;" |
|-
| 
| Antarctica
| Australian Antarctic Territory, claimed by 
|-
|}

e107 meridian east